WCCD (1000 AM) is a commercial daytime-only radio station licensed to Parma, Ohio, that is temporally silent but operates as an internet-only station with a religious format known as "Radio 1000". Owned by New Spirit Revival Center Ministries, Inc., co-founded by the Rev. Darrell C. Scott, WCCD serves Greater Cleveland and parts of surrounding Northeast Ohio. The station's studios are located at The New Spirit Revival Church in the Cleveland suburb of Cleveland Heights. WCCD's silent status is due to the station transmitter, which resided in North Royalton, being redeveloped by the land owner.

WCCD signs off at sunset to protect WMVP in Chicago and a number of other clear-channel stations on adjacent frequencies. In addition to a standard analog transmission, WCCD is available online.

History
WCCD began as WSUM on May 31, 1973. The initial lineup included longtime television fixtures Jim Doney, Linn Sheldon and Gib Shanley (sports director), plus Ted Alexander and Joey James. In addition, a full news staff included Michael Hissam (news director), Pat Longworth and Nancy Watson. Just a few months after signon, WSUM's operators went bankrupt and the station leaves the air.

The Christian Broadcasting Association of Canton purchased WSUM in October 1976 and resumed programming under new management. It airs religious programs on a pre-taped basis from local and national sources. The rest of the day is talk programming with hosts including Merle Pollis.

Mortenson Broadcasting put both WSUM and WTOF up for sale in August 1986 after purchasing Akron station WHLO. Jack Mortenson, co-founder of the chain, purchased WHLO because it had a stronger signal than both WSUM and WTOF combined, and common ownership of more than one AM station with overlapping signals was prohibited at the time. When the sale to Jack Boyd's American Sunrise Communications was completed on January 1, 1987, WSUM was renamed WCCD on February 1, retaining the religious format. American Sunrise sold WCCD, along with four other stations, to Guardian Communications for $5.6 million in 1990.

Under Guardian ownership, WCCD marketed itself as a "family-friendly" station that de-emphasized preaching of the "fire and brimstone" archetype, but still featured conservative personalities like Phyllis Schlafly and Dr. James Dobson. Despite the marketing, WCCD's most popular program was the reactionary populism-themed What's Right, What's Left, hosted by the Rev. Ernie Sanders, a Berea pastor that became a visible leader in anti-abortion movements and was described by station management as "even more to the right than Rush Limbaugh".

Guardian put up the nine-station chain for auction in September 1996 after Carl Linder (who through Great American Insurance held a 50 percent ownership stake in the company and recently divested its stake in Citicasters) announced his intention to sell his stake in Guardian, inducing the company's other co-owners to follow along. While the stations were originally intended to be sold separately, with a $700,000 minimum asking price for WCCD, Salem Communications purchased it, along with Guardian's Baltimore and Cincinnati stations, for $3 million. Salem retained the religion format as a complement to WHK, which had been purchased by the chain the previous year.

Salem changed WCCD's format by late January 2003, dropping all of the religious and brokered programming in favor of conservative talk as The Voice, programmed largely by the Salem Radio Network; syndicated hosts included Bill Bennett, Mike Gallagher, Dennis Prager, Michael Medved and Hugh Hewitt.

WCCD was then put up for sale, airing a mix of Christian contemporary music and leased-time gospel music paid for by the New Spirit Revival Center Church, who ultimately bought the station in April 2005 and over time turned it into a more preacher focused religious format, featuring a mix of local and national hosts. Dr. Darrell C. Scott - co-founder of the New Spirit Revival Center - hosts a daily program on WCCD, as does his wife Belinda.

The station filed for an STA request for a power reduction with the FCC on June 16, 2022, after their North Royalton transmitter site was to be redeveloped by the land owner. The station was taken silent on September 22, 2022, with an application to move to WHK's transmitter site in Seven Hills.

References

External links

1973 establishments in Ohio
Gospel radio stations in the United States
Radio stations established in 1973
CCD
CCD
CCD